Octopussy is the soundtrack for the eponymous thirteenth James Bond film. The score was composed by John Barry, the lyrics by Tim Rice. The opening theme, "All Time High" is sung by Rita Coolidge and is one of six Bond film title songs or songs that are not named after film's title.

The original compact disc released in 1985, by A&M Records, was recalled because of a printing error, and became a rarity. In 1997, the soundtrack was released, by Rykodisc, with the original soundtrack music and some film dialogue, (additional tracks, No. 3, No. 7, and No. 10 seen below) on an Enhanced CD version. The 2003 release, by EMI, restored the original soundtrack music sans dialogue. The original music video of "All Time High" shows Rita Coolidge in very soft focus in what appears to be an Indian palace, but which is actually one of the film's locations, the Royal Pavilion in Brighton, England.

Track listing
Original Release/2003 Remastered Version:
 "All Time High" – Rita Coolidge
 "Bond Look-Alike"
 "009 Gets the Knife and Gobinda Attacks"
 "That's My Little Octopussy"
 "Arrival at the Island of Octopussy"
 "Bond at the Monsoon Palace"
 "Bond Meets Octopussy"
 "Yo-Yo Fight and Death of Vijay"
 "The Chase Bomb Theme"
 "The Palace Fight"
 "All Time High (Movie Version)" – Rita Coolidge

1997 release:
 "All Time High" – Rita Coolidge
 "Bond Look-Alike"
 "Miss Penelope"—dialogue
 "009 Gets the Knife and Gobinda Attacks"
 "That's My Little Octopussy"
 "Arrival at the Island of Octopussy"
 "Introducing Mr Bond"—dialogue
 "Bond at the Monsoon Palace"
 "Bond Meets Octopussy"
 "Poison Pen"—dialogue
 "Yo-Yo Fight and Death of Vijay"
 "The Chase Bomb Theme"
 "The Palace Fight"
 "All Time High" – Rita Coolidge

See also
 Outline of James Bond

References

Soundtrack albums from James Bond films
Soundtrack
1983 soundtrack albums
A&M Records soundtracks
John Barry (composer) soundtracks